Khaled Muhiuddin is a Bangladeshi journalist of international news media DW, writer Former Assistant Commissioner of Bangladesh Government and Advisor of the World Bank and Magistrate. He is known as Bangladeshi presenter of the popular talk show of Independent Satellite Channel Independent Television of Ajker Bangladesh. Khaled is currently working as head of the German-based international media, Deutsche Welle Bangla Department.

Early life 
Khaled was born in Dhaka on 16 September 1974. His ancestral residence in Comilla. He married IFIC Bank officer Farhana Shawn on 2 February 2001. While working in the Media of Bangladesh, he lived for some time in Mirpur, Dhaka with his wife Farhana Shawn and his daughter.

Education 
Khaled has graduated from the Department of Mass Communication and Journalism at Dhaka University. He does part-time teaching in this department. He was also a part-time teacher at Jahangirnagar University. He received his MA degree from West Minister University in the UK in 2003–2004.

Career 
Though his career began with journalism, Khaled held the post of magistrate who passed BCS examination of the Bangladesh Government Work Commission for a few months. He reported on the legal court, mineral resources as the daily Prothom Alo's city page editor and senior reporter of the magazine. He was also engaged in planning and editing the Dhakai Thaki. For some time, he was the message editor at online newspaper and private news agency Bdnews24.com. He was executive producer in Independent Television, a Bangladesh-based private television channel for 7 years. Be presented The talk show Ajker Bangladesh from the same channel. In 2006, Edward and Muro joined the International Visiter Leadership Program as a follow-up to the United States as journalists from Bangladesh. He was a World Bank consultant from 2008 to 2009.

Published books 
The number of books published by Khaled Muhiuddin is 9. These include two books titled Concept of Communication and Communication Theory written jointly with Professor ASM Asaduzzaman which are taught as textbooks at Dhaka University and Barisal University. The books published are
 Communication Ideas
 Communication Theory
 Some of me
 A Millennium Previous Story
 One day of Aminullah'
 1419 – Storybook
 human weakness
 Travelogue 'Tittha Moment'
 Control C Control V

References 

1974 births
Living people
People from Comilla District
People from Dhaka District
Bengali-language writers
Bangladeshi textbook writers
University of Dhaka alumni
Bangladeshi journalists